100 Greatest Hockey Players may refer to:

The Hockey News#All-time NHL player rankings
100 Greatest NHL Players